Pone Fa'amausili (born 26 February 1997) is a Samoan-Australian rugby union footballer who plays for the Melbourne Rebels in Super Rugby.  His position of choice is prop.

Super Rugby statistics

References

External links
itsrugby.co.uk Profile

1997 births
Australian rugby union players
Australian sportspeople of Samoan descent
Melbourne Rebels players
Rugby union props
Living people
Melbourne Rising players
Rugby union players from Melbourne
Australia international rugby union players